Albion Reed Hodgdon (November 1, 1909, Boothbay Harbor, Maine – December 31, 1976, Rochester, New Hampshire) was an American botanist, plant taxonomist, herbarium curator, and leading authority on the flora of New England.

Hodgdon graduated from the University of New Hampshire in 1932 with a B.S. in botany and in 1934 with an M.S. in botany. He graduated from Harvard University in 1936 with a Ph.D. in botany. His doctoral thesis, supervised by Merritt Lyndon Fernald, is entitled "A Monographic Study of the Genus Lechea". With Lyman B. Smith, Hogdon collected plants in Virginia, the Florida Keys, and Cuba in 1936 and in Kentucky in 1937.

In 1936 Hodgdon joined the faculty of the University of New Hampshire as an instructor and was promoted in 1941 to associate professor and eventually to full professor. He was the chair of the botany department from 1947 to 1967, when he retired.

He was the editor-in-chief of the journal Rhodora from 1962 until 1974. He was the president of the New England Botanical Club from 1974 to 1976. As curator of the University of New Hampshire's herbarium, he created a huge botanical collection, "surpassed perhaps only by the one at Harvard." The herbarium was renamed the Albion R. Hodgdon Herbarium in his honor.

In 1941 he married Audrey McKown (1908–1988). They had two sons and a daughter.

Selected publications

References

External links
 
 

1909 births
1976 deaths
20th-century American botanists
University of New Hampshire alumni
Harvard University alumni
University of New Hampshire faculty